

Men's events

Women's events

Medal table

Events at the 1983 Pan American Games
Fencing at the Pan American Games
1983 in fencing
International fencing competitions hosted by Venezuela